A given name (also known as a forename or first name) is the part of a personal name that identifies a person, potentially with a middle name as well, and differentiates that person from the other members of a group (typically a family or clan) who have a common surname. The term given name refers to a name usually bestowed at or close to the time of birth, usually by the parents of the newborn. A Christian name is the first name which is given at baptism, in Christian custom.

In informal situations, given names are often used in a familiar and friendly manner. In more formal situations, a person's surname is more commonly used. The idioms '' and 'being on first-name terms' refer to the familiarity inherent in addressing someone by their given name.

By contrast, a surname (also known as a family name, last name, or gentile name) is normally inherited and shared with other members of one's immediate family. Regnal names and religious or monastic names are special given names bestowed upon someone receiving a crown or entering a religious order; such a person then typically becomes known chiefly by that name.

Name order

The order given name – family name, commonly known as the Western order, is used throughout most European countries and in countries that have cultures predominantly influenced by European culture, including North and South America; North, East, Central and West India; Australia, New Zealand, and the Philippines.

The order family name – given name, commonly known as the Eastern order, is primarily used in East Asia (for example in China, Japan, Korea, Taiwan, Malaysian Chinese, Singapore, and Vietnam, among others), as well as in Southern and North-Eastern parts of India, and as a standard in Hungary. This order is also used to various degrees and in specific contexts in other European countries, such as Austria and adjacent areas of Germany (that is, Bavaria), and in France, Belgium, Greece and Italy, possibly because of the influence of bureaucracy, which commonly puts the family name before the given name. In China and Korea, part of the given name may be shared among all members of a given generation within a family and extended family or families, in order to differentiate those generations from other generations.

The order given name – father's family name – mother's family name is commonly used in Spanish-speaking countries to acknowledge the families of both parents. Today the order can also be changed legally in Spain and Uruguay using given name – mother's family name – father's family name.

The order given name – mother's family name – father's family name is commonly used in Portuguese-speaking countries to acknowledge the families of both parents.

The order given name - father's given name - grandfather's given name (often referred to as triple name) is the official naming order used in Arabic countries (for example Saudi Arabia, Iraq and UAE).

Compound

In many Western cultures, people often have multiple given names. Most often the first one in sequence is the one that a person goes by, although exceptions are not uncommon, such as in the cases of John Edgar Hoover (J. Edgar) and Dame Mary Barbara Hamilton Cartland (Barbara).
The given name might also be used in compound form, as in, for example, John Paul or a hyphenated style like Bengt-Arne. A middle name might be part of compound given name or might be, instead, a maiden name, a patronymic, or a baptismal name. Sometimes, a given name is used as just an initial, especially in combination with the middle initial (such as with H. G. Wells), and more rarely as an initial while the middle name is not one (such as with L. Ron Hubbard).

In England, it was unusual for a person to have more than one given name until the seventeenth century when Charles James Stuart (King Charles I) was baptised with two names. That was a French fashion, which spread to the English aristocracy, following the royal example, then spread to the general population and became common by the end of the eighteenth century.

Some double given names for women were used at the start of the eighteenth century but were used together as a unit: Anna Maria, Mary Anne and Sarah Jane. Those became stereotyped as the typical names of servants and so became unfashionable in the nineteenth century.

Double names are also common among Vietnamese names to make repeated name in the family. For example, Đặng Vũ Minh Anh and Đặng Vũ Minh Ánh, are two sisters with the given names Minh Anh and Minh Ánh.

Legal status 
A child's given name or names are usually chosen by the parents soon after birth. If a name is not assigned at birth, one may be given at a naming ceremony, with family and friends in attendance. In most jurisdictions, a child's name at birth is a matter of public record, inscribed on a birth certificate, or its equivalent. In western cultures, people normally retain the same given name throughout their lives. However, in some cases these names may be changed by following legal processes or by repute. People may also change their names when immigrating from one country to another with different naming conventions.

In certain jurisdictions, a government-appointed registrar of births may refuse to register a name that may cause a child harm, which is considered offensive or which is deemed impractical. In France, the agency can refer the case to a local judge. Some jurisdictions, such as Sweden, restrict the spelling of names. In Denmark, one does not need to register a given name for the child until the child is six months old, and in some cases, one can even wait a little longer than this, before the child gets an official name.

Origins and meanings

Parents may choose a name because of its meaning. This may be a personal or familial meaning, such as giving a child the name of an admired person, or it may be an example of nominative determinism, in which the parents give the child a name that they believe will be lucky or favourable for the child. Given names most often derive from the following categories:
 Aspirational personal traits (external and internal). For example, the male names:
Clement ("merciful"); as popularised by Pope Clement I (88–98), saint, and his many papal successors of that name;
Augustus ("consecrated, holy"), first popularised by the first Roman Emperor; later (as Augustine) by two saints;
English examples include numerous female names such as Faith, Prudence, Amanda (Latin: worthy of love); Blanche (white (pure));
 Occupations, for example George means "earth-worker", i.e., "farmer".
 Circumstances of birth, for example:
Thomas meaning "twin";
Quintus (Latin: "fifth"), which was traditionally given to the fifth male child.
 Objects, for example Peter means "rock" and Edgar means "rich spear".
 Physical characteristics, for example Calvin means "bald".
 Variations on another name, especially to change the sex of the name (Pauline, Georgia) or to translate from another language (for instance, the names Francis or Francisco that come from the name Franciscus meaning "Frank or Frenchman").
 Surnames,  Such names can honour other branches of a family, where the surname would not otherwise be passed down (e.g., the mother's maiden surname). Modern examples include:
Winston, 
Harrison, 
Ross.
Many were adopted from the 17th century in England to show respect to notable ancestry, usually given to nephews or male grandchildren of members of the great families concerned, from which the usage spread to general society. This was regardless of whether the family name concerned was in danger of dying out, for example with Howard, a family with many robust male lines over history. Notable examples include
Howard, from the Howard family, Dukes of Norfolk;
Courtenay, from the surname of the Earls of Devon;
Trevor, from the Welsh chieftain Tudor Trevor, lord of Hereford;
Clifford, from the Barons Clifford;
Digby, from the family of Baron Digby/Earl of Bristol;
Shirley (originally a man's forename), from the Shirley family, Earls Ferrer;
Percy, from the Percy Earls and Dukes of Northumberland;
Lindsay, from that noble Scottish family, Earls of Crawford;
Graham, from that noble Scottish family, Dukes of Montrose;
Eliot, from the Eliot family, Earls of St Germans;
Herbert, from the Herbert family, Earls of Pembroke;
Russell, from the Russell family, Earls and Dukes of Bedford;
Stanley, from the Stanley family, Earls of Derby;
Vernon, Earl of Shipbrook
Dillon, the Irish family of Dillon, Viscount Dillon
 Places, for example Brittany and Lorraine.
 Time of birth, for example day of the week, as in Kofi Annan, whose given name means "born on Friday", or the holiday on which one was born, for example, the name Natalie meaning "born on Christmas day" in Latin (Noel (French "Christmas"), a name given to males born at Christmas); also April, May, or June.
 Combination of the above, for example the Armenian name Sirvart means "love rose".

In many cultures, given names are reused, especially to commemorate ancestors or those who are particularly admired, resulting in a limited repertoire of names that sometimes vary by orthography.

The most familiar example of this, to Western readers, is the use of Biblical and saints' names in most of the Christian countries (with Ethiopia, in which names were often ideals or abstractions—Haile Selassie, "power of the Trinity"; Haile Miriam, "power of Mary"—as the most conspicuous exception). However, the name Jesus is considered taboo or sacrilegious in some parts of the Christian world, though this taboo does not extend to the cognate Joshua or related forms which are common in many languages even among Christians.  In some Spanish speaking countries, the name Jesus is considered a normal given name.

Similarly, the name Mary, now popular among Christians, particularly Roman Catholics, was considered too holy for secular use until about the 12th century. In countries that particularly venerated Mary, this remained the case much longer; in Poland, until the arrival in the 17th century of French queens named Marie.

Most common given names in English (and many other European languages) can be grouped into broad categories based on their origin:

 Hebrew names, most often from the Bible, are very common in, or are elements of names used in historically Christian countries. Some have elements meaning "God", especially "Eli". Examples: Michael, Joshua, Daniel, Joseph, David, Adam, Samuel, Elizabeth, Hannah and Mary. There are also a handful of names in use derived from the Aramaic, particularly the names of prominent figures in the New Testament—such as Thomas, Martha and Bartholomew.
 All of the Semitic peoples of history and the present day use at least some names constructed like these in Hebrew (and the ancient Hebrews used names not constructed like these—such as Moses, probably an Egyptian name related to the names of Pharaohs like Thutmose and Ahmose). The Muslim world is the best-known example (with names like Saif-al-din, "sword of the faith", or Abd-Allah, "servant of God"), but even the Carthaginians had similar names: cf. Hannibal, "the grace of god" (in this case not the Abrahamic deity God, but the deity—probably Melkart—whose title is normally left untranslated, as Baal).
 Germanic names are characteristically warlike; roots with meanings like "glory", "strength", and "will" are common. The "-bert" element common in many such names comes from beraht, which means "bright". Examples: Robert, Edward, Roger, Richard, Albert, Carl, Alfred, Rosalind, Emma, Emmett, Eric and Matilda.
 French forms of Germanic names. Since the Norman conquest of England, many English given names of Germanic origin are used in their French forms. Examples: Charles, Henry.

Slavic names may be of a peaceful character, the compounds being derived from word roots meaning "to protect", "to love", "peace", "to praise [gods]", or "to give". Examples: Milena, Vesna, Bohumil, Dobromir, Svetlana, Vlastimil. Other names have a warlike character and are built of words meaning "fighter", "war", or "anger". Examples: Casimir, Vladimir, Sambor, Wojciech and Zbigniew. Many of them derive from the root word "slava" ("glory"): Boleslav, Miroslav, Vladislav, Radoslav, Slavomir and Stanislav. Those derived from root word "mir" ("world, peace") are also popular: Casimir, Slavomir, Radomir, Vladimir, Miroslav, Jaczemir.
 Celtic names are sometimes anglicised versions of Celtic forms, but the original form may also be used. Examples: Alan, Brian, Brigid, Mórag, Ross, Logan, Ciarán, Jennifer, and Seán. These names often have origins in Celtic words, as Celtic versions of the names of internationally known Christian saints, as names of Celtic mythological figures, or simply as long-standing names whose ultimate etymology is unclear.
 Greek names may be derived from the history and mythology of Classical Antiquity or be derived from the New Testament and early Christian traditions. Such names are often, but not always, anglicised. Examples: Helen, Stephen, Alexander, Andrew, Peter, Gregory, George, Christopher, Margaret, Nicholas, Jason, Timothy, Chloe, Zoë, Katherine, Penelope and Theodore.
Latin names can also be adopted unchanged, or modified; in particular, the inflected element can be dropped, as often happens in borrowings from Latin to English. Examples: Laura, Victoria, Marcus, Justin (Latin Justinus), Paul (Lat. Paulus), Julius, Cecilia, Felix, Vivian, Julia, Pascal (not a traditional-type Latin name, but the adjective-turned-name paschalis, meaning 'of Easter' (Pascha)).
 Word names come from English vocabulary words. Feminine names of this sort—in more languages than English, and more cultures than Europe alone—frequently derive from nature, flowers, birds, colours, or gemstones. Examples include Jasmine, Lavender, Dawn, Daisy, Rose, Iris, Petunia, Rowan, Jade, and Violet. Male names of this sort are less common—examples like Hunter and Fischer, or names associated with strong animals, such as Bronco and Wolf. (This is more common in some other languages, such as Northern Germanic and Turkish).
 Trait names most conspicuously include the Christian virtues, mentioned above, and normally used as feminine names (such as the three Christian virtues—Faith, Hope, and Charity).
 Diminutives are sometimes used to distinguish between two or more people with the same given name. In English, Robert may be changed to "Robbie" or Thomas changed to "Tommy". In German the names Hänsel and Gretel (as in the famous fairy tale) are the diminutive forms of Johann and Margarete. Examples: Vicky, Cindy, Tommy, Abby, Allie.
 Shortened names (see nickname) are generally nicknames of a longer name, but they are instead given as a person's entire given name. For example, a man may simply be named "Jim", and it is not short for James. Examples: Beth, Ben, Zach, Tom.
 Feminine variations exist for many masculine names, often in multiple forms. Examples: Charlotte, Stephanie, Victoria, Philippa, Jane, Jacqueline, Josephine, Danielle, Paula, Pauline, Patricia, Francesca.

Frequently, a given name has versions in many different languages. For example, the biblical name Susanna also occurs in its original biblical Hebrew version, Shoshannah, its Spanish and Portuguese version Susana, its French version, Suzanne, its Polish version, Zuzanna, or its Hungarian version, Zsuzsanna .

East Asia

Despite the uniformity of Chinese surnames, some Chinese given names are fairly original because Chinese characters can be combined extensively. Unlike European languages, with their Biblical and Greco-Roman heritage, the Chinese language does not have a particular set of words reserved for given names: any combination of Chinese characters can theoretically be used as a given name. Nonetheless, a number of popular characters commonly recur, including "Strong" (Wěi), "Learned" (Wén), "Peaceful" (Ān), and "Beautiful" (Měi). Despite China's increasing urbanization, a great many namessuch as "Pine" (Sōng) and "Plum" (Méi)also still reference nature.

Most Chinese given names are two characters long anddespite the examples abovethe two characters together may mean nothing at all. Instead, they may be selected to include particular sounds, tones, or radicals; to balance the Chinese elements of a child's birth chart; or to honor a generation poem handed down through the family for centuries. Traditionally, it is considered an affront, not an honor, to have a newborn named after an older relative and so full names are rarely passed down through a family in the manner of American English Seniors, Juniors, III, etc. Similarly, it is considered disadvantageous for the child to bear a name already made famous by someone else although their romanizations maybe identical, and a common name like Liu Xiang may be borne by tens of thousands.

Korean names and Vietnamese names are often simply conventions derived from Classical Chinese counterparts.

Many female Japanese names end in -ko, usually meaning "child" on its own. However, the character when used in given names can have a feminine (adult) connotation.

In many Westernised Asian locations, many Asians also have an unofficial or even registered Western (typically English) given name, in addition to their Asian given name. This is also true for Asian students at colleges in countries such as the United States, Canada, and Australia as well as among international businesspeople.

Gender
Most names in English are traditionally masculine (Hugo, James, Harold) or feminine (Daphne, Charlotte, Jane), but there are unisex names as well, such as Jordan, Jamie, Jesse, Morgan, Leslie/Lesley, Joe/Jo, Jackie, Pat, Dana, Alex, Chris/Kris, Randy/Randi, Lee, etc. Often, use for one gender is predominant.  Also, a particular spelling is often more common for either men or women, even if the pronunciation is the same. 

Many culture groups, past and present, did not or do not gender names strongly, so that many or all of their names are unisex. On the other hand, in many languages including most Indo-European languages (but not English), gender is inherent in the grammar. Some countries have laws preventing unisex names, requiring parents to give their children sex-specific names. Names may have different gender connotations from country to country or language to language.

Within anthroponymic classification, names of human males are called andronyms (from Ancient Greek ἀνήρ / man, and ὄνυμα [ὄνομα] / name), while names of human females are called gynonyms (from Ancient Greek γυνή / woman, and ὄνυμα [ὄνομα] / name).

Popularity

The popularity (frequency) distribution of given names typically follows a power law distribution.

Since about 1800 in England and Wales and in the U.S., the popularity distribution of given names has been shifting so that the most popular names are losing popularity. For example, in England and Wales, the most popular female and male names given to babies born in 1800 were Mary and John, with 24% of female babies and 22% of male babies receiving those names, respectively. In contrast, the corresponding statistics for England and Wales in 1994 were Emily and James, with 3% and 4% of names, respectively. Not only have Mary and John gone out of favour in the English speaking world, the overall distribution of names has also changed significantly over the last 100 years for females, but not for males. This has led to an increasing amount of diversity for female names.

Choice of names
Education, ethnicity, religion, class and political ideology affect parents' choice of names. Politically conservative parents choose common and traditional names, while politically liberal parents choose the names of literary characters or other relatively obscure cultural figures.  Devout members of religions often choose names from their religious scriptures.  For example, Hindu parents may name a daughter Saanvi after the goddess, Jewish parents may name a boy Isaac after one of the earliest ancestral figures, and Muslim parents may name a boy Mohammed after the prophet Mohammed.

There are many tools parents can use to choose names, including books, websites and applications. An example is the Baby Name Game that uses the Elo rating system to rank parents preferred names and help them select one.

Influence of popular culture

Popular culture appears to have an influence on naming trends, at least in the United States and United Kingdom. Newly famous celebrities and public figures may influence the popularity of names. For example, in 2004, the names "Keira" and "Kiera" (anglicisation of Irish name Ciara) respectively became the 51st and 92nd most popular girls' names in the UK, following the rise in popularity of British actress Keira Knightley. In 2001, the use of Colby as a boys' name for babies in the United States jumped from 233rd place to 99th, just after Colby Donaldson was the runner-up on Survivor: The Australian Outback. Also, the female name "Miley" which before was not in the top 1000 was 278th most popular in 2007, following the rise to fame of singer-actress Miley Cyrus (who was named Destiny at birth).

Characters from fiction also seem to influence naming. After the name Kayla was used for a character on the American soap opera Days of Our Lives, the name's popularity increased greatly. The name Tammy, and the related Tamara became popular after the movie Tammy and the Bachelor came out in 1957. Some names were established or spread by being used in literature. Notable examples include Pamela, invented by Sir Philip Sidney for a pivotal character in his epic prose work, The Countess of Pembroke's Arcadia; Jessica, created by William Shakespeare in his play The Merchant of Venice; Vanessa, created by Jonathan Swift; Fiona, a character from James Macpherson's spurious cycle of Ossian poems; Wendy, an obscure name popularised by J. M. Barrie in his play Peter Pan, or The Boy Who Wouldn't Grow Up; and Madison, a character from the movie Splash. Lara and Larissa were rare in America before the appearance of Doctor Zhivago, and have become fairly common since.

Songs can influence the naming of children. Jude jumped from 814th most popular male name in 1968 to 668th in 1969, following the release of the Beatles' "Hey Jude". Similarly, Layla charted as 969th most popular in 1972 after the Eric Clapton song. It had not been in the top 1,000 before. Kayleigh became a particularly popular name in the United Kingdom following the release of a song by the British rock group Marillion. Government statistics in 2005 revealed that 96% of Kayleighs were born after 1985, the year in which Marillion released "Kayleigh". 

Popular culture figures need not be admirable in order to influence naming trends. For example, Peyton came into the top 1000 as a female given name for babies in the United States for the first time in 1992 (at #583), immediately after it was featured as the name of an evil nanny in the film The Hand That Rocks the Cradle. On the other hand, historical events can influence child-naming. For example, the given name Adolf has fallen out of use since the end of World War II in 1945.

In contrast with these anecdotal evidence, a comprehensive study of Norwegian first name datasets shows that the main factors that govern first name dynamics are endogenous.  Monitoring the popularity of 1,000 names along 130 years, the authors have identified only five cases of exogenous effects, three of them are connected to the names given to the babies of the Norwegian royal family.

20th century African-American names
Since the civil rights movement of 1950–1970, African-American names given to children have strongly mirrored sociopolitical movements and philosophies in the African American community. Since the 1970s neologistic (creative, inventive) practices have become increasingly common and the subject of academic study.

See also

 Hypocorism or pet name
 List of most popular given names (in many different countries and cultures)
 Maiden and married names
 Name day
 Onomastics
 Personal name
 Praenomen
 Pseudonym
 Saint's name
 Calendar of saints
 Slave name
 Thai name – somewhat special treatment of given names
 Theophoric name
 Theophory in the Bible
 Unisex name
 Bilingual tautological given names

Notes

References

Sources

External links

 
 Given Name Frequency Project – Analysis of long-term trends in given names in England and Wales. Includes downloadable datasets of names for people interested in studying given name trends.
 NameVoyager – Visualization showing the frequency of the Top 1000 American baby names throughout history.
 U.S. Census Bureau: Distribution of Names Files Large ranked list of male and female given names in addition to last names.
 Popular Baby Names – The Social Security Administration page for Popular U.S. Baby Names
 Muslim Names Islamic names with Audio Voice for pronunciation of Arabic names.
 https://blog-en.namepedia.org/2015/11/why-most-european-names-ending-in-a-are-female/ - Why most European names ending in "a" are female
 Name Design   - How to make unique name design and create name art